is a 2016 Japanese anime television series produced by Trigger, Aniplex, and Crunchyroll and written by Mari Okada. The series features character designs by Shirow Miwa. It also features the directorial debut of Hiroshi Kobayashi, assistant director of the anime Rage of Bahamut and episode director for Kill la Kill. 

Kiznaiver follows seven high school students who are chosen to be a part of an experimental program promoting world peace which creates bonds between people by forcing them to share each other's pain.

Plot
Kiznaiver takes place in the futuristic, fictional Japanese town of Sugomori City. While the city appears to be normal, it was created to test a large-scale experiment known as the Kizna System, which connects people through shared pain and suffering, both physical and emotional. Those who are connected to the system are called "Kiznaivers".

A few days before the start of summer vacation, a mysterious and seemingly emotionless girl, Noriko Sonozaki, tells high school student Katsuhira Agata and several of his classmates that they have been selected to become Kiznaivers. Sharing each other's pain allows them to build bonds between their differing lives and personalities.

Characters

 

The story's apathetic and "semi-emotionless" protagonist. His Japanese sin is the Imbecile, resembling the deadly sin of Sloth.
 

A beautiful girl who lacks human kindness and displays no emotion whatsoever. She is in charge of the Kizna System and therefore brings the seven Kiznaivers together through various missions.
 

Katsuhira's childhood friend who is humanistic, emotional, and seemingly nosy at times. Her Japanese sin is the Goody Two-Shoes, resembling the deadly sin of Envy.
 

A delinquent who is excessively impulsive and rowdy, but very protective of his friends. His Japanese sin is the Musclehead Thug, resembling the deadly sin of Wrath.
 

An energetic girl who behaves in an eccentric manner by claiming she "sees fairies". Her Japanese sin is the Eccentric Headcase, resembling the deadly sin of Greed.
 

A sly and self-centered honors student and ladies' man. His Japanese sin is the Two-Faced Normie, resembling the deadly sin of Gluttony.
 

An aloof and intelligent girl who outwardly maintains a cold and condescending attitude towards others. Her Japanese sin is the High-and-Mighty, resembling the deadly sin of Pride.
 

A handsome and distinct man shrouded in mystery. His Japanese sin is the Immoralist, resembling the deadly sin of Lust.
 

An apathetic man who has no motivation to work hard. He is Urushibara's colleague and a member of the Kizna Committee, moonlighting as the high school chemistry teacher.
 

An initially cold and sarcastic woman who has caring and motherly qualities. She is Yamada's colleague and a member of the Kizna Committee, moonlighting as the high school counselor.

Media

Manga
A tie-in manga by Roji Karegishi was published simultaneously by Crunchyroll digitally and by Kadokawa Shoten in their Dengeki Maoh magazine.  It premiered on March 25, 2016, and ended on February 27, 2017. It was compiled in two volumes.

A gag manga featuring the characters in chibi form called  is drawn by S. Kosugi and serialized on Dengeki Comics NEXT. The tankōbon version was released on June 6, 2016. Crunchyroll took the English license for it, titled "Mini! KIZNAIVER Theater".

Anime
Kiznaiver is an original anime series from Trigger. It is directed by Hiroshi Kobayashi and written by Mari Okada. While Shirow Miwa provides original character design, Mai Yoneyama adapted it into anime. The anime has been licensed in the UK by Anime Limited.

Notes

References

External links

 on ABC
 on Pixiv

2016 anime television series debuts
Action anime and manga
Anime with original screenplays
Aniplex franchises
Asahi Broadcasting Corporation original programming
Crunchyroll anime
Crunchyroll manga
Dengeki Comics
Kadokawa Shoten manga
Otter Media franchises
Science fiction anime and manga
Seven deadly sins in popular culture
Seinen manga
Studio Trigger
Television shows written by Mari Okada
Tokyo MX original programming